Abrahadabra is the ninth studio album by Norwegian symphonic black metal band Dimmu Borgir, released in 2010. The first single from the album, "Gateways", was released on 20 August in Europe and 24 August in North America. On 14 September a video for "Gateways" was released featuring Djerv front-woman, Agnete Kjølsrud. On 17 September the song "Born Treacherous" was released on Dimmu Borgir's official Myspace for streaming. On 24 September the band announced they would stream Abrahadabra in its entirety, until 7 p.m. EST that evening. This would mark the first official release of all the tracks on the album. The album features  drummer Daray and additional keyboards by Gerlioz.

Track listing 
All music & lyrics composed by Shagrath, Silenoz and Galder.

Production 
Abrahadabra was in production for eleven months. Silenoz explained that the growing periods of time between albums was because the band had stopped writing music while touring, which was affecting the quality of the music. He described the new album as having an "eerie and haunting feel to it," adding that the material is "epic," "primal," atmospheric and ambient. A promotional image released with the statement showed Shagrath returning to the keyboards. The album features an ensemble orchestra, the Kringkastingsorkestret (the Norwegian Radio Orchestra), as well as the Schola Cantorum choir, totaling more than 100 musicians and singers.

Gaute Storaas, composer of the orchestral arrangements, released a statement on his role in working on the album. “Their music is epic, thematic and symphonic already from the creation; they are clearly having an orchestral approach to composing. My role in this is sometimes just to transcribe their themes, sometimes to take their ideas, tear them apart and build them back up in ways that are true to the band's intentions. The music must also be both interesting and playable for the musicians, and hopefully, meet the quality standards of the orchestral world.”.

Title and artwork 
"Abrahadabra", loosely translated as "I will create as I speak", was created by author Aleister Crowley in his work Liber AL vel Legis, or The Book of the Law. This album is the second in the band's repertoire to deviate from the traditional three-word title. Silenoz explained: "[It made] a lot of sense for us to move on from that. It has served its purpose. We are a band that's all about change and moving forward. An album title consisting of one word goes hand-in-hand with the new material". In addition, Silenoz referenced the changes in the band's "musical and lyrical content", as well as changes in the band's line-up playing a role.

The album cover artwork was designed by Joachim Luetke, who described the artwork's setting as "icy, bleak, wintery, [and] post-industrial". Luetke added that the central figure's mask on the cover is representative of H. P. Lovecraft's Elder Gods. "The mask/face personifies dominion of powers far beyond mankind. The nameless gods witnessed the birth of our universe and they'll watch it implode. To them, the age of mankind is but a blink of an eye".

After the release of the album, the band announced that all future pressings would carry a different album cover.

Musical style 
As stated by guitarists, Silenoz and Galder, in an interview with Outune.net, the album presents musical influences reminiscent of Puritanical Euphoric Misanthropia and Death Cult Armageddon, with more emphasis on orchestral arrangements.

Lyrical content 
The album's lyrics are a notable departure from the usual style that Dimmu Borgir implements. Songs contain subjects that deal with redemption, power, rebirth and astral planes, among other, more vague concepts. Rather than focus on ideas that are often panned as Satanic and offensive, the band has instead opted to use more worldly and open matters. The start of track six contains a backward message: "In Nomine dei Nostri Satanas Luciferi" (English translation: In the name of our God, Satan the Morning Star).

Personnel 

 Dimmu Borgir
 Shagrath  – lead vocals; keyboards, programming
 Galder – lead guitar, additional vocals (track 5)
 Silenoz – rhythm guitar, additional vocals (track 5)
 Additional musicians
 Dariusz Brzozowski – drums
 Snowy Shaw – bass, clean vocals (track 4, 6, 9)
 Geir Bratland – keyboards
 Agnete Kjølsrud – additional vocals (track 3, 10)
 Garm – additional vocals (track 10)
 Andy Sneap – lead guitar (track 3, 9), mixing, mastering
 Ricky Black – slide guitar (track 10)
 Kringkastingsorkesteret (Norwegian Radio Orchestra)
 Atle Sponberg – concertmaster
 Rune Halvorsen – conductor
 Schola Cantorum
 Tone Bianca Dahl – chorus master

 Production
 Dimmu Borgir – production, mixing, mastering
 Shagrath  – photography, sound engineering, keyboards recording
 Gaute Storaas – choir and orchestra arrangements
 Russ Russell – mastering, sound engineering, guitars and bass recording
 Daniel Bergstrand – sound engineering, drums and vocals recording
 Urban Naesvall – drum technician
 Petter Braar – guitar technician
 Kjell Ivar Lund, Marcelo Vasco, Tove Asum Forwald – photography
 Tyson Tabbert – masks and armour construction
 Joachim Luetke – cover artwork and layout, photography
 Giuliana Mayo, Tod Waters – clothing design and construction
 Yvette Uhlmann – management
 Note
Drums and vocals recorded in Dugout Studios, Uppsala, Sweden.
Guitars and bass recorded in Livingroom Studios, Oslo, Norway.
Keyboards and additional tracking recorded at Pimp Plaza Recordings, Oslo, Norway.
Orchestra and choirs recorded at the NRK Studios, Oslo, Norway.
Mastered at Backstage Studio, Derbyshire, England.

Release history

Charts

References 

Dimmu Borgir albums
2010 albums
Nuclear Blast albums